English case may refer to:
 A legal case brought under English law
 The use of grammatical case in the English language